Dicranosterna semipunctata is a species of leaf beetle common in NSW and Victoria, (SE Australia).
It is a honey brown color, strongly convex and feeds on phyllodes Acacia such as blackwood Acacia melanoxylon.
In New Zealand it has become a potential problem for the trees and biological controls have been investigated.

References

Chrysomelinae
Beetles of Australia
Insect pests of temperate forests